Scholz Garten (also known as Scholz Beer Garden) is a beer garden and restaurant in downtown Austin, Texas and the oldest operating business in Texas.

Established by German immigrant August Scholz in 1866 after the American Civil War, Scholz Garten became a hub for German immigrants and their culture in the capital city. It was purchased by The Saengerrunde Club in 1914, who still owns it today. It remains a popular gathering spot for both political discussion and University of Texas sports events.

Scholz Garten was recorded as a Texas Historic Landmark in 1967, and added to the National Register of Historic Places in 1979.  The business lease was purchased in 1986 by Eddie Wilson (founder of the Armadillo World Headquarters and Threadgill's), Phil Vitek, and Michael Osborne who restored it in 1987.

References

External links

Scholz Garten Official Site

Buildings and structures in Austin, Texas
Culture of Austin, Texas
German restaurants in the United States
German-American culture in Texas
National Register of Historic Places in Austin, Texas
Tourist attractions in Austin, Texas
Beer gardens in the United States
Commercial buildings on the National Register of Historic Places in Texas
Recorded Texas Historic Landmarks
Drinking establishments on the National Register of Historic Places
Beer in Texas
City of Austin Historic Landmarks